Mikhail Vostroknutov (born 22 December 1969) is a Russian speed skater. He competed in two events at the 1994 Winter Olympics.

References

External links
 

1969 births
Living people
Russian male speed skaters
Olympic speed skaters of Russia
Speed skaters at the 1994 Winter Olympics
Sportspeople from Perm, Russia